The Northrop Alpha was an American single-engine, all-metal, seven-seat, low-wing monoplane fast mail/passenger transport aircraft used in the 1930s. Design work was done at the Avion Corporation, which in 1929, became the Northrop Aircraft Corporation based in Burbank, California.

Design and development
Drawing on his experience with the Lockheed Vega, John K. Northrop designed an advanced mail/passenger transport aircraft. In addition to all-metal construction, the new Alpha benefitted from two revolutionary aerodynamic advancements: wing fillets researched at the Guggenheim Aeronautical Laboratory at the California Institute of Technology, and a multicellular stressed-skin wing of Northrop's own design which was later successfully used on the Douglas DC-2 and Douglas DC-3. In addition, the Alpha was the first commercial aircraft to use rubber deicer boots on wing and empennage leading edges which, in conjunction with state-of-the-art radio navigation equipment, gave it day or night, all-weather capability. The aircraft first flew in 1930, with a total of 17 built.

The Alpha was further developed into a dedicated fast transport, the Northrop Gamma.

Operational history

The Alpha entered service with Transcontinental & Western Air (TWA) making its inaugural flight on April 20, 1931. The trip from San Francisco to New York required 13 stops and took just over 23 hours. TWA operated 14 aircraft until 1935, flying routes with stops in San Francisco, California; Winslow, Arizona; Albuquerque, New Mexico; Amarillo, Texas; Wichita, Kansas; Kansas City, Missouri; St. Louis, Missouri; Terre Haute, Indiana; Indianapolis, Indiana; Columbus, Ohio; Pittsburgh, Pennsylvania; Philadelphia, Pennsylvania; and New York. Three Alphas were operated by the US military as C-19 VIP transports until 1939.

TWA's were initially operated as a passenger service but the Alpha's were later modified at the Stearman factory in Wichita into the cargo-carrying 4A model with a new type certificate. Stearman and Northrop had the same parent company at the time.

The third Alpha built, NC11Y, was reacquired by TWA in 1975, and is preserved at the Smithsonian National Air and Space Museum.

Variants
Alpha 2 six-passenger version
Alpha 3 two-passenger plus cargo version, several Alpha 2s were converted to this configuration
Alpha 4 cargo version with 2 ft (0.6 m) increased wingspan and large metal fairings encapsulating the main gear for drag reduction. All were converted from Alpha 3s
Alpha 4A cargo version, all converted from Alpha 4s
YC-19 & Y1C-19 military VIP transport, seating reduced to four passengers, serial numbers 31-516 to 31-518, YC-19 had a Pratt & Whitney R-1340-7, while the Y1C-19s had the R-1340-11 engine

Operators

 Trans World Airlines
 US Army Air Corps

Specifications (Alpha 2)

See also

References
Notes

Bibliography

 Eden, Paul and Soph Moeng. The Complete Encyclopedia of World Aircraft. London: Amber Books Ltd., 2002. .
 Fahey, James C. U.S. Army Aircraft 1908-1946 (Heavier-Than-Air) . New York: Ships and Aircraft, 1946.
 Smith, M.J. Jr. Passenger Airliners of the United States, 1926-1991. Missoula, Montana: Pictorial Histories Publishing Company, 1986. .
 Swanborough, F. Gordon and  Peter M. Bowers. United States Military Aircraft Since 1909. New York: Putnam, 1964. .

External links

 "Low-Wing Metal Monoplane Develops High Speed," Popular Mechanics Monthly, July 1930, p. 7 bottom

1930s United States airliners
Alpha
Low-wing aircraft
Single-engined tractor aircraft
Aircraft first flown in 1930
1930s United States mailplanes